Ophelia is a character from William Shakespeare's Hamlet

Ophelia or Ofelia may also refer to:

Film and television
 Ophélia (1963 film)
 Ophelia (2018 film)
 "Ophelia", an episode of Ergo Proxy

Music
 Ophelia (album), an album by Natalie Merchant
 The Ophelias (California band), a San Francisco neo-psychedelic band of the late 1980s
 The Ophelias (Ohio band), an American rock band
Ophelia Records, a record label by American musician Seven Lions

Songs
 "Ophelia" (The Band song)
 "Ophelia" (The Lumineers song) (2016)
 "Ophelia", a song by Tori Amos from Abnormally Attracted to Sin
 "Ophelia", a song by L'Arc-en-Ciel from Awake
 "Ophelia", a song by Dawnstar
 "Ophelia", a song by Peter Hammill from Sitting Targets
 "Ophelia", a song by Kashmir from No Balance Palace
 "Ophelia", a song by Kaya
 "Ophelia", a song by Nikola Šarčević from Freedom to Roam
 "Ophelia", a song by Kula Shaker from Pilgrims Progress
 "Ophelia", a song by Tear Garden from Tired Eyes Slowly Burning
 "Ophelia", a song by Natalie Merchant from Ophelia

Paintings
 Ophelia (painting), an 1852 painting by John Everett Millais
 Ophelia, an 1883 painting by Alexandre Cabanel
 Ophelia, an 1870 painting by Pierre Auguste Cot
 Ophelia, a painting by Arthur Hughes
 Ophelia, an 1895 painting by Paul Albert Steck
 Ophelia, any of several paintings by John William Waterhouse

Places
 Ophelia, Virginia
 Ophelia (moon), a moon of Uranus
 171 Ophelia, an asteroid

Ships
German hospital ship Ophelia, a German hospital ship completed in 1912
 HMS Ophelia, a Royal Navy M-class destroyer launched in 1915

People with the given name
 Ophelia Benson, American author, editor, blogger, and feminist
 Ophelia Dahl (born 1964), British social justice and health care advocate
 Ophelia Ford (born 1950), Tennessee politician
 Ophelia Lovibond (born 1986), English actress
 Ophélia Kolb, French actress
 Ophelia S. Lewis (born 1961), Liberian author
 Ophelia Dimalanta (1932–2010), Filipino poet
 Ophelia Hoff Saytumah, Liberian politician 
 Ophelia Marie (born 1951), Dominican singer
 Ophelia DeVore (1922–2014), American businesswoman, publisher, and model
 Ophelia Gordon Bell (1915–1975), English sculptor 
 Ofelia Rey Castelao (born 1956), Spanish historian, writer, and university professor

Fictional characters
 Ofelia, a character in Pan's Labyrinth
 Ophelia, a character in Claymore
 Ophelia, a character from APB: Reloaded
 Ophelia, a character from Brütal Legend
 Ophelia, a character from Romeo × Juliet
 Ophelia Frump, of the television series The Addams Family
 Ophelia Nigmos, a character appearing in The Sims 2
 Ophelia Ramírez, of the television series The Life and Times of Juniper Lee
 Ophelia St. Clare, of the novel Uncle Tom's Cabin
 Ofelia Salazar, fictional character in Fear the Walking Dead
 Ofelia Santoro, a character in the book Third and Indiana
 Ophelia Sarkissian, a Marvel Comics character and often foe of Captain America and the Avengers

See also
Ophelia (given name)
 Tropical Storm Ophelia, a list of storms